Väike-Tulpe is an island in Lääne-Saare Parish, Saare County, Estonia.

See also
List of islands of Estonia

Islands of Estonia
Saaremaa Parish